Kharf Kureh (also Romanized as Kharf Kūreh; also known as Kharfeh Kūreh) is a village in Shanderman Rural District, Shanderman District, Masal County, Gilan Province, Iran. At the 2006 census, its population was 488, in 120 families.

References 

Populated places in Masal County